Alan Rogers (born 3 January 1977) is an English retired footballer.

Career
As a youngster Rogers was on the books of Liverpool until his dad fell out with one of the coaches. He then moved across the Mersey to Tranmere Rovers and won a place in the side as fast, tough tackling left back. He made his Tranmere debut in November 1995, coming on as a substitute in a league match against Grimsby Town.

In 1997 Nottingham Forest paid £2 million for him. At the time this was the highest transfer fee Tranmere received for a player. He spent several seasons at Forest before leaving for Leicester City. Rogers scored twice for Leicester, with both goals coming in a League Cup tie against Hull City in September 2002. He returned to Forest in 2004, but after a dispute with manager Gary Megson he went on loan to Hull.

After a spell with Bradford City, he joined League Two side Accrington Stanley on 3 January 2007. He was sent off on his Accrington debut after a dangerous tackle on Notts County's David Pipe. Rogers left Accrington at the end of the season, having appeared six times.

In April 2015, Rogers was appointed as caretaker-manager of Tranmere Rovers.

In January 2017, Rogers was appointed manager of Northern Premier League Premier Division side Skelmersdale United.

In April 2018, Rogers pleaded guilty to assault in Chorley magistrates court.

References

External links

Alan Rogers at Sportcareers.co.uk

1977 births
Living people
English footballers
Association football defenders
Tranmere Rovers F.C. players
Nottingham Forest F.C. players
Leicester City F.C. players
Wigan Athletic F.C. players
Hull City A.F.C. players
Bradford City A.F.C. players
Accrington Stanley F.C. players
Premier League players
Footballers from Liverpool
English football managers
Tranmere Rovers F.C. managers
Burnley F.C. non-playing staff
Tranmere Rovers F.C. non-playing staff
Skelmersdale United F.C. managers